Scott McGill (born 27 January 2002) is a Scottish professional  footballer who plays as a midfielder for Raith Rovers, on loan from Heart of Midlothian. He has also previously played for Airdrieonians and Kelty Hearts.

Early and personal life
Born in Edinburgh, McGill grew up in Gorgie and attended Balgreen primary school,then he  joined the SFA performance program at Broughton High school in Edinburgh .

Career
He played youth football for Hutchison vale and Tynecastle and later for Heart of Midlothian. He signed his first professional contract with the club in June 2018. He made his debut for Heart of Midlothian on 10 October 2020 in a 1–0 Scottish League Cup victory over Cowdenbeath, and appeared again for them three days later in a 3–1 League Cup victory over Raith Rovers. He made his league debut for Hearts on 20 April 2021 in a goalless draw with Greenock Morton.

On 21 July 2021, he joined Scottish League One club Airdrieonians on loan until May 2022. McGill scored on his debut for Airdrieonians in a 2–0 win in the League Cup against their Lanarkshire derby rivals Motherwell. He went on to play 41 times and score 1 league cup goal and 4 league goals for Airdrieonians during the 2021–22 Scottish League One season.

McGill was loaned to Kelty Hearts in August 2022. He would make 13 appearances and would score 1 goal in a 2-0 league victory against Falkirk. McGill returned to his parent club Hearts on January 2023. Later that month, he would join Scottish Championship club Raith Rovers on loan until the end of the season.

Career statistics

References

External links

2002 births
Living people
Scottish footballers
Association football midfielders
Heart of Midlothian F.C. players
Airdrieonians F.C. players
Footballers from Edinburgh
Scottish Professional Football League players
Kelty Hearts F.C. players

Raith Rovers F.C. players